
Gmina Trzyciąż is a rural gmina (administrative district) in Olkusz County, Lesser Poland Voivodeship, in southern Poland.

The gmina contains part of the protected area called Dłubnia Landscape Park.

Villages
Gmina Trzyciąż contains the villages and settlements of Glanów, Imbramowice, Jangrot, Małyszyce, Michałówka, Milonki, Podchybie, Porąbka, Ściborzyce, Sucha, Trzyciąż, Zadroże and Zagórowa.

Neighbouring gminas
Gmina Trzyciąż is bordered by the gminas of Gołcza, Olkusz, Skała, Sułoszowa and Wolbrom.

References
Polish official population figures 2006

Trzyciaz
Olkusz County